Rørvika or Rørvik is a village in the municipality of Indre Fosen in Trøndelag county, Norway.

Norwegian County Road 715 and Norwegian County Road 717 meet at Rørvik, and Fv 715 continues across the Trondheimsfjord as part of the Flakk–Rørvik Ferry, which has one terminus at Rørvik.

References

Villages in Trøndelag
Indre Fosen
Ferry quays in Trøndelag